Oak Hill-Piney is a census-designated place (CDP) in Delaware County, Oklahoma, United States. It was first listed as a CDP prior to the 2020 census.

The CDP is in east-central Delaware County. The southern border of Oak Hill-Piney is Beaty Creek, a west-flowing tributary of Spavinaw Creek flowing into Lake Eucha and part of the Neosho River watershed.

Demographics

References 

Census-designated places in Delaware County, Oklahoma
Census-designated places in Oklahoma